Boyd Orr (born November 29, 1945) is an American politician. He has served as a Republican member for the 115th district in the Kansas House of Representatives since 2017.

References

1945 births
Living people
Republican Party members of the Kansas House of Representatives
21st-century American politicians